Leslie Campbell (14 October 1902 – 19 August 1970) was an Australian cricketer. He played two first-class matches for New South Wales in 1925/26.

See also
 List of New South Wales representative cricketers

References

External links
 

1902 births
1970 deaths
Australian cricketers
New South Wales cricketers
Cricketers from Sydney